Molecular communications systems use the presence or absence of a selected type of molecule to digitally encode messages. The molecules are delivered into communications media such as air and water for transmission. The technique also is not subject to the requirement of using antennas that are sized to a specific ratio of the wavelength of the signal. Molecular communication signals can be made biocompatible and require very little energy.

Nature
Molecular signaling is used by plants and animals, such as the pheromones that insects use for long-range signaling.

Alcohol
In 2016 researchers demonstrated the use of evaporated alcohol molecules to carry messages across several meters of open space and successfully decoded the message on the other side. The presence of molecules encoded to digital 1 and their absence encoded to 0. The hardware cost around 100 US dollars.

Chemical systems
There is a wireless network that uses a chemical system as the physical medium for data transmission, instead of the environment. The signals representing electronic messages transmitted through the wireless communication channel of this wireless computer network are changes of the chemical system's chemical composition.

References

Telecommunications techniques
Pheromones